"" (Lord God, we praise you) is a Lutheran hymn, which Martin Luther wrote in 1529 as a translation and partial paraphrase of the Latin Te Deum. It is sometimes called the German Te Deum. The hymn was first published in 1529. Its hymn tune, Zahn No. 8652, is a simplification of the melody of the traditional . It has appeared in 24 hymnals.

Text and melody 

Luther translated and slightly expanded the Latin text of the Te Deum, which is also known as the Ambrosian Hymn, but is currently credited to Nicetas of Remesiana, a bishop of the 4th century. Luther wrote 27 verses, intending it for two responsorial groups. The song of praise, thanks and petition is used regularly on festive occasions.

For a melody, Luther used a simplified version of the traditional melody of the early Christian Te Deum. The early tune is based on an evening song of the Greek church, which in turn may go back to early Christian rites or an evening song of the synagogue. Luther's version was first published in Joseph Klug's  (Spiritual Songs) in Wittenberg in 1529. No copy of this edition is extant. It has appeared in 24 hymnals.

Musical settings 

Johann Hermann Schein composed in 1618  for four choirs and two instrumental groups ("Capellen"); and in 1627 a setting for four-part choir and continuo.

Felix Mendelssohn composed a setting Herr Gott, dich loben wir (Te Deum) for solo voices, double chorus, four trombones, strings, and organ, first performed at the Berlin Cathedral on 6 August 1843, to mark "the millennium of the founding of the German Reich".

See also 

 List of hymns by Martin Luther

References

External links 

 Reinhard Schmidt-Rost: Predigt im Semesterschlußgottesdienst am 27.Januar 2013 über Luthers Te Deum, EG 191 Bonn University 

16th-century hymns in German
Hymn tunes
Hymns by Martin Luther